A list of works by or about William Stanley Merwin (September 30, 1927 – March 15, 2019).  Merwin was an American poet, credited with over fifty books of poetry, translation and prose.

Poetry
Collections
 1952: A Mask for Janus, New Haven, Connecticut: Yale University Press; awarded the Yale Younger Poets Prize, 1952 (reprinted as part of The First Four Books of Poems, 1975)
 1954: The Dancing Bears, New Haven, Connecticut: Yale University Press (reprinted as part of The First Four Books of Poems, 1975)
 1956: Green with Beasts, New York: Knopf (reprinted as part of The First Four Books of Poems, 1975)
 1960: The Drunk in the Furnace, New York: Macmillan (reprinted as part of The First Four Books of Poems, 1975)
 1963: The Moving Target, New York: Atheneum
 1966: Collected Poems, New York: Atheneum
 1967: The Lice, New York: Atheneum; (reprinted in 2017, Port Townsend, Washington: Copper Canyon Press)
 1969: Animae, San Francisco: Kayak
 1970: The Carrier of Ladders, New York: Atheneum – winner of the Pulitzer Prize
 1970: Signs, illustrated by A. D. Moore; Iowa City, Iowa: Stone Wall Press
 1973: Writings to an Unfinished Accompaniment, New York: Atheneum
 1975: The First Four Books of Poems, containing A Mask for Janus, The Dancing Bears, Green with Beasts, and The Drunk in the Furnace, New York: Atheneum; (reprinted in 2000, Port Townsend, Washington: Copper Canyon Press)
 1977: The Compass Flower, New York: Atheneum
 1978: Feathers From the Hill, Iowa City, Iowa: Windhover
 1982: Finding the Islands, San Francisco: North Point Press
 1983: Opening the Hand, New York: Atheneum
 1988: The Rain in the Trees, New York: Knopf
 1988: Selected Poems, New York: Atheneum
 1993: The Second Four Books of Poems, Port Townsend, Washington: Copper Canyon Press
 1993: Travels: Poems, New York: Knopf – winner of the 1993 Lenore Marshall Poetry Prize
 1996: The Vixen: Poems, New York: Knopf
 1997: Flower and Hand: Poems, 1977–1983 Port Townsend, Washington: Copper Canyon Press
 1998: The Folding Cliffs: A Narrative, a "novel-in-verse" New York: Knopf
 1999: The River Sound: Poems, New York: Knopf
 2001: The Pupil, New York: Knopf
 2005: Migration: New and Selected Poems, Port Townsend, Washington: Copper Canyon Press – winner of the National Book Award for Poetry
 2005: Present Company, Port Townsend, Washington: Copper Canyon Press
 2005:  Selected Poems, Tarset, Northumberland, UK: Bloodaxe Books
2008: The Shadow of Sirius, Port Townsend, Washington: Copper Canyon Press – winner of the Pulitzer Prize; 2009: Tarset, Northumberland, UK: Bloodaxe Books
 2013: The Collected Poems of W. S. Merwin, New York: Library of America
 2014: The Moon Before Morning, Port Townsend, Washington: Copper Canyon Press; Hexham, Northumberland, UK: Bloodaxe Books
 2016: Garden Time, Port Townsend, Washington: Copper Canyon Press; Hexham, Northumberland, UK: Bloodaxe Books
 2017: The Essential W.S. Merwin, Port Townsend, Washington: Copper Canyon Press

List of poems

Prose
 1970: The Miner's Pale Children, New York: Atheneum (reprinted in 1994, New York: Holt)
 1977: Houses and Travellers, New York: Atheneum (reprinted in 1994, New York: Holt)
Regions of Memory
 1982: Unframed Originals: Recollections
 1992: The Lost Uplands: Stories of Southwest France, New York: Knopf
 2002: The Mays of Ventadorn, National Geographic Directions Series; Washington: National Geographic
 2004: The Ends of the Earth, essays, Washington: Shoemaker & Hoard
 2005: Summer Doorways: A Memoir
 2007: The Book of Fables, Port Townsend, Washington: Copper Canyon Press

Plays
 1956: Darkling Child (with Dido Milroy), produced this year
 1957: Favor Island, produced this year at Poets' Theatre in Cambridge, Massachusetts (broadcast in 1958 by Third Programme, British Broadcasting Corporation)
 1961: The Gilded West, produced this year at Belgrade Theatre, Coventry, England

Translations
 1959: The Poem of the Cid, London: Dent (American edition, 1962, New York: New American Library)
 1960: The Satires of Persius, Bloomington, Indiana: Indiana University Press
 1961: Some Spanish Ballads, London: Abelard (American edition: Spanish Ballads, 1961, New York: Doubleday Anchor)
 1962: The Life of Lazarillo de Tormes: His Fortunes and Adversities, a Spanish novella; New York: Doubleday Anchor
 1963: The Song of Roland
 1969: Selected Translations, 1948–1968, New York: Atheneum – winner of the PEN Translation Prize
 1969: Twenty Love Poems and a Song of Despair, poems by Pablo Neruda; London: Jonathan Cape (reprinted in 2004 with an introduction by Christina Garcia, New York: Penguin Books)
 1969: Products of the Perfected Civilization, Selected Writings of Chamfort, also author of the introduction; New York: Macmillan
 1969: Voices: Selected Writings of Antonio Porchia, Chicago: Follett (reprinted in 1988 and 2003, Port Townsend, Washington: Copper Canyon Press)
 1969: Transparence of the World, poems by Jean Follain, New York: Atheneum (reprinted in 2003, Port Townsend, Washington: Copper Canyon Press)
 1971: "Eight Quechua Poems", The Hudson Review
 1973: Asian Figures, New York: Atheneum
 1974: Osip Mandelstam: Selected Poems (with Clarence Brown), New York: Oxford University Press (reprinted in 2004 as The Selected Poems of Osip Mandelstam, New York: New York Review of Books)
 1977: Sanskrit Love Poetry (with J. Moussaieff Masson), New York: Columbia University Press (published in 1981 as Peacock's Egg: Love Poems from Ancient India, San Francisco: North Point Press)
 1977: Vertical Poetry, poems by Roberto Juarroz; San Francisco: Kayak (reprinted in 1988; San Francisco: North Point Press)
 1978: Euripides' Iphigeneia at Aulis (with George E. Dimock, Jr.), New York: Oxford University Press
 1979: Selected Translations, 1968–1978, New York: Atheneum
 1981: Robert the Devil, an anonymous French play; with an introduction by the translator; Iowa City, Iowa: Windhover
 1985: Four French Plays, including Robert the Devil; The Rival of His Master and Turcaret by Alain-René Lesage; and The False Confessions by Pierre de Marivaux; New York: Atheneum
 1985: From the Spanish Morning, consisting of Spanash Ballads by Lope de Rueda and Eufemia: The Life of Lazarillo de Torres (originally translated in Tulane Drama Review, December 1958); New York: Atheneum
 1989: Sun at Midnight, poems by Musō Soseki (with Soiku Shigematsu)
 1996: Pieces of Shadow: Selected Poems of Jaime Sabines
 1998: East Window: The Asian Translations, translated poems from earlier collections, Port Townsend, Washington: Copper Canyon Press
 2000: Purgatorio from The Divine Comedy of Dante; New York: Knopf
 2002: Gawain and the Green Knight, a New Verse Translation, New York: Knopf; 2003: Tarset, Northumberland, UK: Bloodaxe Books
 2013: Selected Translations, translated poems from 1948–2010, Port Townsend, Washington: Copper Canyon Press
 2013: Collected Haiku of Yosa Buson, Port Townsend, Washington: Copper Canyon Press (with Takako Lento)
 2013: Sun At Midnight, poems by Muso Soseki, Port Townsend, Washington: Copper Canyon Press (with Soiku Shigematsu) (updated and reissued)
 2018: Purgatorio: A New Translation, from The Divine Comedy of Dante, Copper Canyon Press

Editor
 1961: West Wind: Supplement of American Poetry, London: Poetry Book Society
 1996: Lament for the Makers: A Memorial Anthology (compiler), Washington: Counterpoint

References

Bibliographies by writer